Ronald Francis Shepherd (15 July 1926 – 12 October 2012) was the tenth Anglican Bishop of British Columbia, serving from 1984 to 1991.

Shepherd was educated at the University of British Columbia and trained for the priesthood at King's College London and ordained in 1953. Following a curacy at St Stephen's, Rochester Row he was Rector of St Paul's, Glanford, Ontario and then All Saints, Winnipeg. He was Dean of Edmonton from 1967, and then, from 1969, Dean of Montreal before his appointment to the episcopate in 1984.

Shepherd's daughter, Mary Shepherd, published an illustrated volume of his letters, entitled “It Happened at the Cathedral.” The book includes his personal letters, his sermons, as well as poetry, all accompanied by her collages and portraits.

References

1926 births
2012 deaths
University of British Columbia alumni
Alumni of the Theological Department of King's College London
Associates of King's College London
Anglican Church of Canada deans
Anglican bishops of British Columbia
20th-century Anglican Church of Canada bishops
Deans of Edmonton
Deans of Montreal